Marco Amabili is a professor who holds the Canada Research Chair (Tier 1)  in Vibrations and Fluid-Structure Interaction, Department of Mechanical Engineering at McGill University, Montreal, Québec, Canada.

Biography and achievements  

Marco Amabili was born and raised in San Benedetto del Tronto, Italy. He studied at the University of Ancona (now renamed Marche Polytechnic University) where he received his M.S. in Mechanical Engineering. He obtained his Ph.D. in Mechanical Engineering from the University of Bologna. Amabili is very well known for his extensive research on nonlinear vibrations and dynamic stability of shell and plate structures, a subject to which he has given many innovative contributions. Professor Amabili serves as Contributing Editor for International Journal of Non-linear Mechanics (Elsevier). He is also Associate Editor of the Journal of Fluids and Structures, Elsevier; he served as associate editor of Applied Mechanics Reviews, ASME, and Journal of Vibration and Acoustics, ASME. He is member of the editorial board of several journals, including the Journal of Sound and Vibration, Elsevier. He is a member of the executive committee of the Applied Mechanics Division of the American Society of Mechanical Engineers (ASME) and the Chair of the ASME Technical Committee Dynamics and Control of Systems and Structures. Marco Amabili is an elected Fellow of the Royal Society of Canada. He received the Christophe Pierre Research Excellence Award from McGill University in 2015, was elected Fellow of the European Academy of Sciences and Arts in 2018 and as foreign member of Academia Europaea in 2020. He is a Fellow of the Canadian Academy of Engineering and the Engineering Institute of Canada. He was elected chair of the Canadian National Committee for IUTAM (International Union of Theoretical and Applied Mechanics) in 2019. Amabili delivered the Koiter lecture of the Dutch Research School on Engineering Mechanics in 2019. The Koiter lecture honors researchers who have made profound contributions to the field of Engineering Mechanics, and it has a rich history. In 2020 he received the Worcester Reed Warner Medal of the ASME; established in 1930, it is one of the society award with the longest history. He received the 2021 Raymond D. Mindlin medal of the American Society of Civil Engineers (ASCE) for outstanding research contributions to applied solid mechanics. He was awarded the Cataldo Agostinelli and Angiola Gili-Agostinelli International Prize for mechanics of the Lincei National Academy of Sciences of Italy in November 2021. Amabili was the recipient of the 2022 Guggenheim Fellowship in engineering.

Professor Amabili is working in the area of vibrations, nonlinear dynamics and stability of thin-walled structures, reduced-order models, fluid-structure interaction and vascular biomechanics. His research is multi-disciplinary, and it has been utilized in the design and analysis of aeronautical and aerospace structures, laminated and FGM shell structures, improving the design of vascular grafts, safety of pressure tanks and innovative flow-meters. Amabili is the author of over 500 papers (about 250 in refereed international journals, including Nature Communications, Physical Review X and PNAS) in applied mechanics and has achieved a high h-Index. He is the author of the monographs Nonlinear Vibrations and Stability of Shells and Plates  and Nonlinear Mechanics of Shells and Plates in Composite, Soft and Biological Materials  both published by Cambridge University Press.

Amabili, together with M.P. Païdoussis and F. Pellicano, showed for the first time the strongly subcritical behavior of the stability of circular cylindrical shells conveying flow. A series of papers  presented theoretical, numerical and experimental investigations, showing that a supported circular shell made of aluminum presents divergence for much smaller velocity than predicted by linear theory.
Since 2014, Amabili developed innovative shell theories with thickness deformation. These theories were extended to model soft biological tissues that undergo large thickness deformations and are described as incompressible and hyperelastic. This interest was expanded into the experimental and numerical study of the mechanics of the human aorta, the viscoelastic characterization of aortic tissues with and without smooth muscle activation and aortic grafts.

In 2017 Amabili participated to a research with the Technical University of Delft to identify the Young modulus of Graphene nano-drums from nonlinear vibrations; the outcome of the study was published in Nature Communications.

Amabili was the first to report the experimentally observed nonlinear damping in large-amplitude vibrations in 2003. He developed, for the first time, original and innovative models of nonlinear damping by introducing geometric nonlinearity in linear viscoelasticity, a very complex and important problem in engineering applications.

Education 

Ph.D. in Mech. Eng. – University of Bologna, Italy, 1996
M.Sc. in Mech. Eng. – Marche Polytechnic University, Ancona, Italy, 1992

International awards 
Worcester Reed Warner Medal of the American Society of Mechanical Engineers (ASME), 2020
Raymond D. Mindlin Medal of the American Society of Civil Engineers (ASCE), 2021
Cataldo Agostinelli and Angiola Gili-Agostinelli International Prize of the Lincei National Academy of Sciences of Italy, 2021
Guggenheim Fellowship in Engineering for USA and Canada, John Simon Guggenheim Memorial Foundation, 2022
Fellow of the Royal Society of Canada, 2020
Foreign Member of Academia Europaea, 2020
Member of the European Academy of Sciences and Arts, 2018
Fellow of the Canadian Academy of Engineering, 2019
Member of the European Academy of Sciences, 2020 
Rayleigh Lecture Award, American Society of Mechanical Engineers (ASME), 2022
Blaise Pascal Medal in engineering, European Academy of Sciences (Brussels), 2022
Koiter lecture of the Dutch research school on Engineering Mechanics in 2019
Fellow of the Engineering Institute of Canada, 2020
Christophe Pierre Research Excellence Award, McGill University, 2015
Fellow of the American Society of Mechanical Engineers (ASME), 2011

Books 

M. Amabili, Nonlinear vibrations and stability of shells and plates, Cambridge University Press (2008). 
M. Amabili, Nonlinear mechanics of shells and plates in composite, soft and biological materials, Cambridge University Press (2018).

References 

Academic staff of McGill University
Living people
Fellows of the American Society of Mechanical Engineers
Fellows of the Canadian Academy of Engineering
Members of the European Academy of Sciences and Arts
Year of birth missing (living people)